Butterfield Elementary School was a publicly funded grade school in the Lake Elsinore Unified School District, in California, USA. It was named after the old Butterfield Overland Stage route which runs in front of the school. It provided many innovative programs to its students. In 1995, Butterfield became the new home of the first Elementary Visual and Performing Arts (VAPA) Magnet School Program in Riverside County (its first home had been Elsinore Elementary School). Coincidentally, the second VAPA school program in Riverside County started in September 1991 at Butterfield School of the Arts in the Moreno Valley Unified School District, in Moreno Valley, CA

Butterfield Elementary School received many grants and awards, especially in the performing arts field. Students from Butterfield  performed with well-known groups and celebrities, such as The Young Americans and Mark Wahlberg. This school closed permanently on June 3, 2010, after 28 years of service to the community. The entire student and teacher population (along with the same attendance boundaries) moved 3 miles south to the campus of Lakeland Village Middle School which was renamed Lakeland Village School as it became a K-8 school. This was basically a relocation of the Butterfield Community into a new location, which was to an underused four-year-old middle school building. The school kept the same students and teachers, although the classified staff and the principal changed. Two-thirds of the existing middle school population of students and teachers moved to different schools. The Butterfield name and history were carried forward in the renaming of the Lakeland Village auditorium as the Butterfield Performing Arts Center, although the Butterfield Community continued on under the new name.

A renaissance of Butterfield Elementary by the Fall of 2015 was planned, as the LEUSD hired an architectural firm and construction company to rebuild the campus. It was expected that some primary grades would return to the campus for the  2015/16 year and the rest of the campus would reopen to Grades up through the 6th grade by the fall of 2016. At that time Lakeland Village School would have reformed as a 7th/8th grade Junior High Campus, as the remaining elementary students would have returned to Butterfield. However, after investigation by the planning and architectural firms, it was decided that reconstruction costs would be too high to deal with possible seismic refits and the plan to reopen the school has been cancelled. The idea of a Butterfield Renaissance appears to now be dead.

The site has been purchased by Riverside County to be used as a Community Center which will be called the Lakeland Village Community Center. The Grand Opening of the Lakeland Village Community Center officially took place on June 11, 2016, 6 years after the closing day of Butterfield Elementary. The beautiful student murals have all been painted over and many trees have been cut down. The portable classrooms are in the process of being removed, and the modular classrooms are being renovated. The Butterfield School Library has been converted into a Fitness/Dance Room; the Staff Lounge has become an Arts & Crafts Room, and the Teacher Workroom has become the Tots Room. The old Health Office is now a Reading Room. The Multipurpose Room has had beautiful wood floors installed and a wheelchair lift has been added for access to the stage.

History 
On October 7, 1858, the first westbound Butterfield Overland Stage arrived at the new outpost at the Machado Rancho La Laguna ranch house located near "Laguna Grande", the future Lake Elsinore. The  Butterfield Overland Trail route through the Elsinore valley (now known as Grand Ave.) was used as a mail route until 1862. Butterfield Elementary School, named in commemoration of this famous trail, opened with a K-6 population of 482 students in fall 1982 with Frank Evans as principal. It is located slightly over a mile southeast of the original Butterfield Stage outpost. The Butterfield Overland Trail route runs directly in front of the school.

Butterfield Elementary's campus is also located one mile southeast of the site of Grand School, one of Elsinore's two original schools which were both built in 1884. Grand School was located near the corner of Macy Street and Grand Avenue.

Butterfield Elementary School was built as the fourth currently used elementary school in Lake Elsinore. Existing elementary schools in Lake Elsinore at the time of Butterfield's construction were Elsinore Elementary, Wildomar Elementary and Machado Elementary schools. There are now 14 elementary or K-8 schools in the Lake Elsinore Unified School District (one other school, Jean Hayman Elementary closed in June, 2008-09 due to budget cuts, and will not reopen due to seismic findings). Being a magnet school Butterfield had students who live throughout the district, but most of the school's students continued their education at Lakeland Village Middle School (now Lakeland Village School (K-8), and Lakeside High School.

Due to enrollment impaction within the district Butterfield was on double sessions for primary grades, with two teachers and classes sharing the same rooms, during the years 1985/86 -1987/88. During these three years Colleen Andersen was the school's principal. With the opening of Jean Hayman Elementary in 1985/86 and Railroad Canyon Elementary in 1988/89, classes returned to a traditional setting. Cheryl Eining was principal of the school for four years, starting with the 1988/89 school year.

On July 1, 1989 the Elsinore Union High School District merged with the Lake Elsinore School District (elementary) to form the Lake Elsinore Unified School District.

The Lake Elsinore Unified School District implemented an elementary Visual and Performing Arts (VAPA) magnet program, starting in the 1989/90 school year. The initial six years of the elementary level magnet program were at Elsinore Elementary School under the direction and guidance of Principal Craig Richter and the magnet program coordinator Fran Robinson. In the 1995/96 school year the magnet program moved to Butterfield Elementary School where it was located under the guidance of Principal Dorri Neal, who had become principal of Butterfield starting with the 1992/93 school year. Also in 1995/96, all Grade 6 classes were moved from district elementary schools to create Grades 6 through 8 middle schools.

In 1996/97 Butterfield implemented California's Class Size Reduction (CSR) program by placing only 20 students in Grade 1, then added Grade 2 to the program in 1997/98, and Kindergarten and Grade 3 in 1998/99.

For 11 years, 1991/92 through 2001/02, Butterfield was on a single-track, Year-round school schedule with classes held year round except for August, December and April. Some district schools had multiple-track, year-round schedules. In 2002/03 the district moved back to a traditional school calendar schedule with all schools starting in August and finishing in June.

Butterfield underwent a modernization program in summer 2005 which replaced hardware, replaced air conditioning/heating units and ductwork, upgraded electrical and computer services, and replaced carpeting. All buildings and classrooms were repainted and all new furnishings were purchased for the school at that time. During summer 2007, the front of the school received a new look with the removal of a grassy area and the installation of a large new planter.

In fall 2009, it was proposed to close the Butterfield Elementary campus and combine its students with those at a nearby middle school, to form the Lakeland Village School. On February 11, 2010, the Lake Elsinore Unified School District Governing Board voted to close the campus and to proceed with the conversion of the Lakeland Village Middle School into a K-8th grade facility. Butterfield closed on the last day of school on June 3, 2010, after 28 years of service to the Lakeland Village community. The district believed it would save $500,000 through the closure. Most students from Butterfield continued at the new campus. On February 11, 2010, a new principal, Rita Post, was appointed to head the Lakeland Village School, with the then Butterfield principal, Dorri Neal, becoming principal at William Collier Elementary. The district spent approximately $1.5 million to renovate the 5 year old Lakeland Village Middle School to accommodate the K-5th grade students. The entire student and teacher population (along with the same attendance boundaries) moved 3 miles south to the campus of Lakeland Village Middle School which was renamed Lakeland Village School as it becomes a K-8 school.

This was a relocation of the Butterfield Community into a new location, which was an underused four-year-old middle school building. The school  kept the same students and teachers, although the classified staff and the principal will change. Two-thirds of the existing middle school population of students and teachers moved to different schools. The Butterfield name and history was carried forward in the renaming of the Lakeland Village auditorium as the Butterfield Performing Arts Center, although the "Butterfield Community" continued on under the new name.

An event called "Celebrate Butterfield" was held for the community on May 8, 2010, with a review of the school's history, as well as a reunion of present and past parents, students and teachers. The doors closed forever as the children left for the last time on June 3, 2010. The school's final musical, a performance of Honk Jr. was held on June 6, 2010. In its closing year, the Butterfield Elementary API tests scores increased to 853, a growth of 76 points, the second largest elementary increase in all of Riverside and San Bernardino counties.

A renaissance? 
On February 13, 2014 the Lake Elsinore Unified School District Board of Trustees voted to hire an architectural firm and construction company for the rebuilding of Butterfield. It was expected that some primary grades would return to the rebuilt campus by the fall of 2015, and the remainder of students up through 6th grade would return for the 2016/17 school year. However, after investigation by the planning and architectural firms, it was decided that reconstruction costs would be too high to deal with possible seismic refits and the plan to reopen the school has been cancelled. The idea of a Butterfield Renaissance appears to now be dead.

Mission and vision statements
Butterfield Elementary School's mission was to provide a safe, positive, and challenging learning environment which maximizes opportunities for its diverse student population to develop academically, socially, emotionally, and physically into responsible citizens through a comprehensive, sequential curriculum provided by a No Child Left Behind Act (NCLB) highly qualified professional staff.

Butterfield Elementary School's vision was to maintain an NCLB highly qualified staff which is guided by a shared commitment to educate all of its students to reach their fullest potential in academics, as measured by the California State Standards. Equally important are students' positive attitudes, participation in athletics and the arts, within a well-defined, cohesive, comprehensive and standards-based instructional program. Butterfield is dedicated to the recognition of the unique contribution of each person in the school community and to value opportunities for collaboration. The school community will inspire each student to give his/her personal best effort to achieve individual success at school.

Facilities and amenities 
The school had 45 classrooms with grades kindergarten through fifth grades, and 850 students. It also housed two classes of  'First 5 California' state pre-school students (morning and afternoon), two state SDC pre-school classes (morning and afternoon),  and a no-cost on-site Think Together after-school program. There were also several local daycare programs available with before and after school child care, most of which offer transportation to and from school.

The Butterfield library had over 15,000 volumes and a computer mini-lab with ten Macintosh eMacs for research. The school's theatre/MPR was equipped with full sound and lighting capabilities for classroom performances, as well as schoolwide productions. BESTv was a complete green-screen video production laboratory which was used for filming not only classroom plays but also schoolwide plays, Reader's Theatre, and other varied educational activities.

Butterfield had a modern computer laboratory with 33 Thin-client PCs, and a portable laptop laboratory with 16 Apple Macintosh iBooks. The Title I class/lab had six PCs for individualized student instruction under teacher supervision. Each classroom had a portable video projector available and a PC laptop for teacher use, as well as at least one eMac Apple computer for teacher and student use. Most classes had document cameras (ELMO-type) for use in conjunction with the classroom video projector. Every classroom has Internet capability and a telephone for communications.

School climate and educational programs
Butterfield has an accepting and inviting school climate. The recently adopted Lake Elsinore Unified School District Strategic Plan states that students are the top priority in all that the district does: a belief that is firmly held by the Butterfield community. Staff, parents, and students are encouraged to fully participate in the development of the school's programs and activities. Staff members take active leadership roles in defining the school's direction.

Innovative programs include an artist-in-residency program, art and music laboratories, a green-screen video production studio, SRA intervention programs, the Fast Track Reading Intervention program, an Accelerated Reader incentive program, Barton dyslexia tutors, Lindamood Phoneme Sequencing (LiPS) groups, Sea Stars, STAR (Stop, Think and Read) literacy groups for second grade, STAR assessments, transitional/developmental-first grade classrooms as needed, Gifted and Talented Education (GATE) and Intervention after-school programs and specialized combination classes. The school has two Resource Specialist Program (RSP) classrooms and a special education classroom. Butterfield uses the Hampton-Brown Avenues program (adopted 2007) for English language learners, the Houghton-Mifflin Reading series, and enVision Mathematics (adopted 2008–09) for all grades. Butterfield's administrators believe in shared leadership and support the staff in making professional choices regarding curriculum, within the State and District guidelines.

Visual and performing arts program 

Butterfield became a Visual and Performing Arts (VAPA) magnet school in 1995 when the program was moved from Elsinore Elementary to Butterfield. A unique feature of the Butterfield Visual and Performing Arts Program was that instruction was offered to all students regardless of grade level. Until 2007, it was the only existing elementary arts magnet school in Riverside County, and was still the only program to offer Kindergarten through 5th grade VAPA content until its closure in June 2010.

Butterfield had a music and drama artist-in-residence (Ilene Moore, former Young American) as well as a part-time art teacher and a shared band teacher. Butterfield produced 12 major theater productions over the years including the full-length shows of Peter Pan, Oliver!, The Wizard of Oz and Annie Jr., as well as Willy Wonka Jr. which was produced in the spring 2009. Honk Jr. was Butterfield's final performance in June, 2010. Butterfield's theatre productions were produced by Barbara Egbert and/or Kim Rosales and have been directed by Ilene Moore. Students from across the district's boundaries, as well as those from neighboring school districts, attended Butterfield to participate in the magnet program. Many families chose to enroll their children in Kindergarten and continue throughout their elementary years at BES. There was always a waiting list for families desiring enrollment.

Butterfield students performed with the world-famous group, The Young Americans, in several stage, recording, and television productions. Butterfield hosted several Young American Outreach Tours and workshops. Several Butterfield alumni became members of The Young Americans including Auriol Steel and Cynthia Pulley. Butterfield alumni are still consistently considered to be among the top performers in local high school and community theatre ensembles.

Honors, awards and grants 
There were numerous honors and grants for the school over the years including, most recently, the prestigious "Golden Bell" award for distinctive arts programs awarded by the California School Boards Association. Butterfield was a Los Angeles Music Center "BRAVO" Award school finalist, and "BRAVO" teacher finalist honors have gone to second grade teacher Monique Poldberg and fifth grade teacher Barbara Egbert. A Toyota Tapestry Grant was awarded to the school's second grade team, and provided numerous extensions into the arts, science and literacy. A federal art grant, ArtsLINC, was recently funded which provided the Butterfield K-2 staff with the opportunity to participate in staff development focused on literacy and the arts. SEISMIC, a math grant in association with California State University, San Marcos, had its focus for fifth grade teachers on math content standards and lesson delivery. Butterfield received a five-year Healthy Start grant, a California State Technology Grant to create its BESTv video laboratory, a CTAAP grant, a Teaching American History grant. The school received recognition from a California State legislator, and the Los Angeles County Board of Supervisors.

Butterfield was honored to be the "treatment" school for the "RAISE (Reading and Arts Integrated for Student Excellence)" federal art grant, of nearly one million dollars. Butterfield staff had numerous opportunities for staff development in the "VIEW: Visual Integration to Enhance Writing" process, as well as Reader's Theatre to enhance reading comprehension. Over the 15 years to 2009/2010 as a magnet school, Butterfield shared in almost three million dollars of grant-funded activities, largely through the efforts of its teachers and district grant writers.

Student ethnicity 
Butterfield's ethnicity, and comparisons to the district and state averages, are as follows:

Principals

External links 
 
 Butterfield farewell video

References 
 The original version of this article contained text copied from https://web.archive.org/web/20070928015406/http://leusd.info/bes/BESHistory/History.htm, a GFDL source.

Educational institutions established in 1982
Education in Riverside County, California
Defunct schools of the performing arts in the United States
Defunct schools in California
1982 establishments in California
Educational institutions disestablished in 2010
2010 disestablishments in California